Gerald Ndlovu (born 10 December 1984) is a Zimbabwean football defender whoc currently plays for Hwange.

References

1984 births
Living people
Zimbabwean footballers
Hwange Colliery F.C. players
Zimbabwe international footballers
Association football defenders
Zimbabwe Premier Soccer League players